Thliptoceras formosanum is a moth in the family Crambidae. It was described by Eugene G. Munroe and Akira Mutuura in 1968. It is found in China in Fujian, Jiangxi, Guangdong, Guangxi and Guizhou and in Taiwan.

The wingspan is 18–24 mm. The wings are dark, greyish fuscous in males and paler, more yellowish in females.

References

Moths described in 1968
Pyraustinae